Day on the Green was a recurring concert in Oakland, California, presented by promoter Bill Graham and his company Bill Graham Presents. Held at the Oakland–Alameda County Coliseum, these events began in 1973 and continued into the early 1990s. The last Day on the Green overseen by Graham took place the same month as his death in a helicopter crash in 1991. There was a series of Day on the Green shows the following year in the wake of Graham's death and there were other shows in 1994-97 at the Oakland Coliseum Stadium - namely U2, Pink Floyd, and the Rolling Stones.

Revival 2015-16
In July 2015, Bay Area concert promoter and owner of the Day On The Green Federal Trademark, Got Live Entertainment was forced to shutter its planned Day On The Green event due to a scheduling issue with the Alameda County Fairgrounds. The show was postponed and ultimately rescheduled for September 10, 2016 with a change in venue to Pioneer Amphitheatre on the campus of California State University East Bay in Hayward. The performance lineup for Day On The Green 2016 consisted of tributes to five artists that appeared at Day On The Green in Oakland; Evolution (Journey), Boys Of Summer (Eagles), Mirage (Fleetwood Mac), Foreigner Unauthorized (Foreigner) and Savor (Santana). In addition to the concert, organizers conducted online voting for the Day On The Green Hall Of Fame. Over 65,000 votes were cast. Led Zeppelin and Journey finished with the highest vote total to become the initial inductees, enshrined in a ceremony at Day On The Green hosted by BAM.

1973
Day On The Green #1: Leon Russell, Loggins and Messina, Elvin Bishop, Mary McCreary (August 5, 1973).

1974
Day On The Green #1: Grateful Dead, The Beach Boys, New Riders of the Purple Sage, Commander Cody and His Lost Planet Airmen (June 8, 1974).
Day On The Green #2 & 3: Crosby, Stills, Nash & Young, The Band, Joe Walsh, Jesse Colin Young (July 13 & 14, 1974)

1975
Day On The Green #1: Chicago, The Beach Boys, Commander Cody and His Lost Planet Airmen, New Riders of the Purple Sage, Bob Seger (May 24, 1975).
Day On The Green #2: The Doobie Brothers, Eagles, Commander Cody and His Lost Planet Airmen, Kingfish (featuring Bob Weir) (June 29, 1975). Surprise guest Elton John came out at both the Eagles and Doobies' encore numbers and joined them onstage. 
Day On The Green #3: Robin Trower, Dave Mason, Peter Frampton, Fleetwood Mac, Gary Wright (August 3, 1975).Called "THE BRITISH ARE COMING" AKA "The INVASION OF THE BRITISH."
Day On The Green #4 & 5: Led Zeppelin, Joe Walsh, the Pretty Things (August 23–24, 1975).(These shows were canceled when Robert Plant suffered serious injuries in a car crash prior to the tour.)
Day On The Green #6: Edgar Winter Group, Johnny Winter, Lynyrd Skynyrd, Earth Quake, [Charlie Daniels][The Winter Brothers Jam]](September 20, 1975). Although featured on the concert poster, Charlie Daniels did not perform, and the Climax Blues Band was substituted. The order of appearance on stage was Earth Quake, Climax Blues Band, Johnny Winter, Lynyrd Skynyrd, Edgar Winter, Winter Brothers Jam.

1976
Day On The Green # 1 & 2: Peter Frampton, Fleetwood Mac, Gary Wright, Status Quo (4/25 only), UFO (5/1 only) (April 25, 1976 / May 1, 1976)Called "The British Are Back to Back" show.
Day On The Green #3: Boz Scaggs, Tower of Power, Santana, Jeff Beck, Journey, Nils Lofgren (June 5, 1976)Jefferson Starship was the originally planned headliner, but were replaced by Boz Scaggs and Tower Of Power.
Day On The Green #4: The J. Geils Band, Jeff Beck, Blue Öyster Cult, Mahogany Rush, Sammy Hagar (June 6, 1976)Sammy Hagar played much too long, but the crew did an 8-minute set change before Mahogany Rush came out.
San Francisco Kool Jazz Festival Day 1: Marvin Gaye, The Temptations, Nancy Wilson, Harold Melvin, Donald Byrd, Hampton Hawes (June 11, 1976)(Technically this is not a Day On The Green, but it was in the same location under the same format)
San Francisco Kool Jazz Festival Day 2: Natalie Cole, Smokey Robinson, Staple Singers, Teddy Pendergrass, B. B. King, Archie Bell (June 12, 1976)(Technically this is not a Day On The Green, but it was in the same location under the same format)
Day On The Green #5: The Beach Boys, America, Elvin Bishop, John Sebastian. (July 2, 1976)This tour marked Brian Wilson's first public performances with The Beach Boys in several years.
Day On The Green #6: Eagles, Linda Ronstadt, Loggins and Messina, Renaissance (August 3, 1976)
Day On The Green #7 (planned): Jethro Tull, Electric Light Orchestra, Rory Gallagher, Camel (Camel cancelled) (August 18, 1976).At the last minute, the concert was moved from the outdoor Coliseum (65,000 capacity) to the indoor Arena next door (19,000 capacity) due to low ticket sales- thus not considered a Day On The Green.
Day on the Green #7 & 8 (proper): The Who, Grateful Dead (October 9 & 10, 1976)

1977
Day On The Green #1: Fleetwood Mac, Doobie Brothers, Gary Wright,  (May 7, 1977).
Day On The Green #2 & 3: Eagles, Steve Miller Band, Heart, Atlanta Rhythm Section, Foreigner (May 28 & 30, 1977).
Day On The Green #4 & 5: Peter Frampton, Lynyrd Skynyrd, Santana, Outlaws (July 2 & 4, 1977).
San Francisco Kool Jazz Festival Day 1: The Dramatics, Pointer Sisters, Manhattans, Roy Ayers' Ubiquity, Brick, Jimmie Walker (July 8, 1977)(Technically this is not a Day On The Green, but it was in the same location under the same format)
San Francisco Kool Jazz Festival Day 2: Natalie Cole, Little Johnny Taylor, Wild Cherry, Tavares, Mighty Clouds of Joy, John Handy (July 9, 1977)(Technically this is not a Day On The Green, but it was in the same location under the same format)
Day On The Green #6 & 7: Led Zeppelin, Derringer, Judas Priest (July 23 & 24 1977)Led Zeppelin's performances took place towards the end of its 1977 North American tour. These were some of the largest Day on the Green shows in its history.  Unknown at the time, these were to be Led Zeppelin's final U.S. shows. Led Zeppelin played only a few more gigs in Europe in 1979 and 1980. A 1980 U.S. tour was announced in support of the new album In Through the Out Door and tickets were sold but the tour did not occur as Led Zeppelin disbanded after the untimely death of drummer John Bonham.

1978
Day On The Green #1: The Beach Boys, Linda Ronstadt, Elvin Bishop, Dolly Parton, Norton Buffalo (May 28, 1978)
Day On The Green #2: Steve Miller, Bob Seger, Outlaws, Ronnie Montrose, Toby Beau Band (June 17, 1978)
Day On The Green #3: Aerosmith, Foreigner, Pat Travers, Van Halen, AC/DC (July 23, 1978)
Day On The Green #4: The Rolling Stones, Santana, Eddie Money, Peter Tosh, Toots and the Maytals (July 26, 1978)
Day On The Green #5: Ted Nugent, Blue Öyster Cult, Journey, AC/DC, Cheap Trick (September 2, 1978)

1979
Day On The Green #1: Boston, Sammy Hagar, Eddie Money, Robert Fleischman (May 6, 1979)Originally the band U.K. was scheduled to open, eventually being replaced by Robert Fleischman.
Day On The Green #2: Journey, The J. Geils Band, UFO, Thin Lizzy, Nazareth, The Rockets (July 4, 1979).This show was alternately called the "4th Of July All American Rock 'N' Roll Show."
Day On The Green #3: Ted Nugent, Aerosmith, AC/DC, Frank Marino & Mahogany Rush, St. Paradise (July 21, 1979).Also called "The Monsters Of Rock" show. Ted Nugent, Aerosmith and AC/DC's set has been bootlegged in video form. This was reputedly the only footage from any of the 1970s Day On The Green concerts to be available, (other film footage has been found, but not widely released - Fleetwood Mac from 1976 for one). It was somehow taken from the famous Bill Graham vault c2006-2007. Footage of Lynyrd Skynyrd performing "Freebird" at the 7/4/1977 Day on the Green can be seen in the documentary film  "Freebird - The Movie"
Funk On The Green #1: Parliament-Funkadelic, Bootsy's Rubber Band, Brides of Funkenstein, Bar-Kays, Sister Sledge, Confunkshun, Parlet (August 4, 1979)This was considered an offshoot of the more rock music-based Days On The Green.
Day On The Green #4: Foghat, Foreigner, The Cars, Gamma, Bram Tchaikovsky (September 15, 1979).This show was also called "Stars Of the 80s" and "Rock 'N' Roll Party" in advertisements.

1980
Day On The Green #1: Sammy Hagar, Blue Öyster Cult, REO Speedwagon, Triumph, Randy Hansen (July 4, 1980).This concert was also called "Cruisin' On The Green" in advertisements. Originally The Babys were scheduled to appear, with Triumph and Randy Hansen replacing them.
Day On The Green #2: Journey,  Black Sabbath, Cheap Trick, Molly Hatchet, Shakin' Street, 415 (July 27, 1980)Originally Angel City was scheduled to open the show, but was replaced by Shakin' Street.

1981
Day On The Green #1: Heart, Blue Öyster Cult, Pat Travers, Loverboy, Ozzy Osbourne, 415 (July 4, 1981). 
Day On The Green #2: REO Speedwagon, Kansas, UFO, Gamma, 38 Special (August 2, 1981).

1982
Day On The Green #1: Journey, Santana, Toto, Gamma, The Tubes (June 26, 1982).
Day On The Green #2: Foreigner, Loverboy, Scorpions, Iron Maiden (July 18, 1982).
Day On The Green #3: The Who, The Clash, T-Bone Burnett (October 23, 1982).

1983
Day On The Green #1: Journey, Triumph, Eddie Money, Bryan Adams, Night Ranger (July 30, 1983).Gary Moore was originally slated to appear but was replaced with Bryan Adams
Day On The Green #2: Simon & Garfunkel (August 20, 1983) (Billed as "An evening with Simon & Garfunkel" - first reunion tour since breaking up in 1972).
Day On The Green #3: The Police, The Fixx, Madness, Oingo Boingo, and The Thompson Twins (September 10, 1983).
Day On The Green #4: David Bowie, The Tubes, Translator (September 17, 1983).

1984
No Day On The Green held this year.

1985
Day On The Green #1: Scorpions, Ratt, Y&T, Metallica, Rising Force, Victory (August 31, 1985)
Day On The Green #2: Wham!, The Pointer Sisters, Katrina and the Waves (September 1, 1985)These two concerts were held on the same weekend, making an odd pairing of the very metal-driven D.O.G. #1 vs the very youthful pop oriented D.O.G. #2 following right after.
Bruce Springsteen & the E Street Band (September 18–19, 1985) (Not billed as a Day On The Green, but promoted the same way. There were no support acts).

1986
No Day On The Green held this year.

1987
Day On The Green #1: Bob Dylan, Grateful Dead (July 24, 1987).
Day On The Green #2: Mötley Crüe, Whitesnake, Poison, Jetboy (October 10, 1987).
Day On The Green #3 & 4: U2, The Pretenders, The BoDeans, The Soup Dragons (November 14–15, 1987).

1988
Day On The Green # 1 & 2: Pink Floyd (April 22 & 23, 1988).
Amnesty International Benefit: Bruce Springsteen & the E Street Band, Peter Gabriel, Tracy Chapman, Youssou N'Dour (September 23, 1988) (Not billed as a Day On The Green, but promoted the same way).

Sting was originally on the bill for the tour but was not part of the Oakland show

1989
In Concert Against AIDS Benefit: Grateful Dead, Tracy Chapman, John Fogerty, Los Lobos, Joe Satriani, Tower Of Power (May 27, 1989) (Not billed as a Day On The Green, but promoted the same way)
Day On The Green #1 & 2: The Who (August 29 & 30, 1989) (Billed as "An evening with The Who").
Day On The Green #3 & 4: The Rolling Stones, Living Colour (Guns N' Roses were on the bill but did not perform) (November 4 & 5, 1989).After visiting some areas hit by the infamous October 1989 Bay Area earthquake, Mick Jagger donates $500,000 to the victims.

1990
Day On The Green #1: New Kids on the Block, Perfect Gentlemen, Rick Wes, Chris Pittman (September 8, 1990)(This was billed as a Day On The Green).

1991
Day On The Green #1: Metallica, Queensrÿche, Faith No More, Soundgarden (October 12, 1991).The final Day On The Green presented by Bill Graham before his death.

1992
Day On The Green #1: Genesis (June 20, 1992).
Day On The Green #2: Guns N' Roses, Metallica, Body Count (September 24, 1992).
Day On The Green #3: U2, Public Enemy, Sugarcubes (November 7, 1992).

1999
Day On The Green: Sammy Hagar, Megadeth, Sevendust, Machine Head, Sprung Monkey, Loudmouth, DDT (October 10, 1999). Sponsored by KSJO. Located at the Santa Clara County Fairgrounds, San Jose, CA.

See also
List of historic rock festivals
List of jam band music festivals

References

External links

Festivals in the San Francisco Bay Area
History of the San Francisco Bay Area
Rock festivals in the United States
Music of the San Francisco Bay Area
Culture of Oakland, California
Music festivals established in 1973